Vaughn Solomon Schofield,  (born October 25, 1943) was the 21st Lieutenant Governor of Saskatchewan, from 2012 to 2018.  Her appointment as Lieutenant Governor was made by Governor General of Canada David Lloyd Johnston on the Constitutional advice of Prime Minister of Canada Stephen Harper on March 6, 2012, to succeed Gordon Barnhart.  Solomon Schofield was sworn in on March 22, 2012 at the Legislative Assembly of Saskatchewan. She was the viceregal representative of Queen Elizabeth II of Canada in the Province of Saskatchewan. Solomon Schofield is a strong supporter of the Canadian Forces, and stated during her installation that the military would be her focus during her term. Her affection for the Forces stemmed from her time as Provincial Chair of the Canadian Forces Liaison Council, a position she was appointed to in January 2006.  Solomon Schofield is also Honorary Colonel of 38 Artillery Tactical Group, which is part of 38 Canadian Brigade Group. She was formerly Honorary Colonel of 38 Service Battalion.

Personal life
Solomon Schofield was born in Regina, but has most recently resided in Regina Beach, Saskatchewan.  She was educated at the University of Saskatchewan, Regina Campus and the Ray-Vogue School in Chicago, where she earned a degree in Fashion Merchandising.  She was married to the late Gordon L. Schofield and is the mother of Dr. Whitney Wignall, a pediatric dentist, and George, a graduate in Business Administration, who held the position of Mayor of Regina Beach in 2012. She is of English, Irish, Romanian and Ukrainian descent.

Schofield is fluent in English and Spanish.

Career
Solomon Schofield was actively involved in a number of organizations. In the 1980s, she chaired the Board of Crime Watch, a 200,000-member crime prevention organization with groups in cities throughout North and South America.  She has been Committee Chair, President, Vice-President and/or board member of a number of organizations in Regina, including St. John Ambulance, the Assiniboia Club, the Duke of Edinburgh's Award, the Royal United Services Institute, and the Hospitals of Regina Foundation.  Solomon Schofield also served as Chief financial officer of Sprite North America for ten years.

Solomon Schofield's other present and past board memberships and affiliations include: the Saskatchewan Roughriders (Honorary Director), 2003 Grey Cup Committee (Chair-Security Volunteers), Regina Chamber of Commerce Business to Business Expo, Opera Saskatchewan and the Salvation Army.

She is currently President and CEO of the Western Group of Companies, a business real estate organization holding interests throughout Western Canada.

Honours
 Commemorative Medal for the Centennial of Saskatchewan, 2005
 Saskatchewan Volunteer Medal, 2007
 Saskatchewan Order of Merit, 2012 (Also Chancellor of the Order during her term as Lieutenant Governor)
 Queen Elizabeth II Diamond Jubilee Medal, 2012
 Order of St. John of Jerusalem, 2012
 Service Medal of the Order of St. John, 2012
 Canadian Forces Decoration, 2019

References

External links
 "Lieutenant Governor Vaughn Solomon Schofield"
 "PM announces Vaughn Solomon Schofield as Lieutenant Governor of Saskatchewan"

1943 births
Lieutenant Governors of Saskatchewan
Living people
Members of the Saskatchewan Order of Merit
People from Regina, Saskatchewan
Women in Saskatchewan politics
Canadian women viceroys
Canadian people of Irish descent
Canadian people of English descent
Canadian people of Romanian descent
21st-century Canadian politicians
21st-century Canadian women politicians
Illinois Institute of Art – Chicago alumni